Caroline Mitchell (born 28 June 1958) is a Canadian fencer. She competed in the women's individual and team foil events at the 1984 Summer Olympics.

References

External links
 

1958 births
Living people
Canadian female fencers
Olympic fencers of Canada
Fencers at the 1984 Summer Olympics
Sportspeople from Quebec City
20th-century Canadian women